Edwin Forrest School is a public elementary school located in the Mayfair neighborhood of Philadelphia, Pennsylvania. It is within the School District of Philadelphia.

It was designed by Irwin T. Catharine and built in 1928–1929. It is a three-story, eight-bay, yellow brick building in the Art Deco style. It features an arched entryway with terra cotta trim, terra cotta cornice, and brick parapet. It was named for actor Edwin Forrest (1806–1872).

It was added to the National Register of Historic Places in 1988.

Students zoned to Forrest are also zoned to Austin Meehan Middle School and Abraham Lincoln High School.

References

External links
 Edwin Forrest Elementary School
 

School buildings on the National Register of Historic Places in Philadelphia
Art Deco architecture in Pennsylvania
School buildings completed in 1929
Northeast Philadelphia
Public elementary schools in Philadelphia
School District of Philadelphia
1929 establishments in Pennsylvania